A head-on collision is a traffic collision where the front ends of two vehicles such as cars, trains, ships or planes hit each other when travelling in opposite directions, as opposed to a side collision or rear-end collision.

Rail transport 

With railways, a head-on collision occurs most often on a single line railway.  This usually means that at least one of the trains has passed a signal at danger, or that a signalman has made a major error.  Head-on collisions may also occur at junctions, for similar reasons. In the early days of railroading in the United States, such collisions were quite common and gave to the rise of the term "Cornfield Meet". As time progressed and signalling became more standardized, such accidents became less frequent.  Even so, the term still sees some usage in the industry. The origins of the term are not well known, but it is attributed to accidents happening in rural America where farming and cornfields were common. The first known usage of the term was in the mid-19th century.

The distance required for a train to stop is usually greater than the distance that can be seen before the next blind curve, which is why signals and safeworking systems are so important.

List of collisions 

Note: if the collision occurs at a station or junction, or trains are travelling in the same direction, then the collision is not a pure head-on collision

Sea transport 

With shipping, there are two main factors influencing the chance of a head-on collision.  Firstly, even with radar and radio, it is difficult to tell what course the opposing ships are following. Secondly, big ships have so much momentum that it is very hard to change course at the last moment.

Road transport 

Head-on collisions are an often fatal type of road traffic collision. The NHTSA defines a head-on collision thusly:

In Canada, in 2017, 6,293 vehicles and 8,891 persons were involved in head-on collision, injuring 5,222 persons and killing 377 other.

U.S. statistics show that in 2005, head-on crashes were only two percent of all crashes, yet accounted for ten percent of U.S. fatal crashes. A common misconception is that this over-representation is because the relative velocity of vehicles travelling in opposite directions is high. While it is true (via Galilean relativity) that a head-on crash between two vehicles traveling at 50 mph is equivalent to a moving vehicle running into a stationary one at 100 mph, it is clear from basic Newtonian Physics that if the stationary vehicle is replaced with a solid wall or other stationary near-immovable object such as a bridge abutment, then the equivalent collision is one in which the moving vehicle is only traveling at 50 mph., except for the case of a lighter car colliding with a heavier one. The television show MythBusters performed a demonstration of this effect in a 2010 show.

In France, in the years 2017 and 2018, 2563 and 2556 head-on collisions (collision frontales) outside built-up area outside motorways killed 536 and 545 people respectively. They represent about 16% of all the fatalities including the ones on motorways and within built-up area.

Head-on collisions, sideswipes, and run-off-road crashes all belong to a category of crashes called lane-departure or road-departure crashes. This is because they have similar causes, if different consequences. The driver of a vehicle fails to stay centered in their lane, and either leaves the roadway, or crosses the centerline, possibly resulting in a head-on or sideswipe collision, or, if the vehicle avoids oncoming traffic, a run-off-road crash on the far side of the road.

Preventive measures include traffic signs and road surface markings to help guide drivers through curves, as well as separating opposing lanes of traffic with wide central reservation (or median) and median barriers to prevent crossover incidents. Median barriers are physical barriers  between the lanes of traffic, such as concrete barriers or cable barriers.  These are actually roadside hazards in their own right, but on high speed roads, the severity of a collision with a median barrier is usually lower than the severity of a head-on crash.

The European Road Assessment Programme's Road Protection Score (RPS) is based on a schedule of detailed road design elements that correspond to each of the four main crash types, including head-on collisions.  The Head-on Crash element of the RPS measures how well traffic lanes are separated.  Motorways generally have crash protection features in harmony with the high speeds allowed. The Star Rating results show that motorways generally score well with a typical 4-star rating even though their permitted speeds are the highest on the network. But results from Star Rating research in Britain, Germany, the Netherlands and Sweden have shown that there is a pressing need to find better median (central reservation), run-off and junction protection at reasonable cost on single carriageway roads.

Another form of head-on crash is the wrong-way entry crash, where a driver on a surface road turns onto an off-ramp from a motorway or freeway, instead of the on-ramp. They can also happen on divided arterials if a driver turns into the wrong side of the road. Considerable importance is placed on designing ramp terminals and intersections to prevent these incidents. This often takes to form of special signage at freeway off-ramps to discourage drivers from going the wrong way.  Section 2B.41 of the Manual on Uniform Traffic Control Devices describes how such signs should be placed on American highways.

Neither vehicle in a head-on collision need be a "car"; the Puisseguin road crash was between a truck and a coach.

Sideswipe collisions 

Sideswipe collisions are where the sides of two vehicles travelling in the same or opposite directions touch. They differ from head-on collisions only in that one vehicle impacts the side of the other vehicle rather than the front. Severity is usually lower than a head-on collision, since it tends to be a glancing blow rather than a direct impact. However, loss of control of either vehicle can have unpredictable effects and secondary crashes can dramatically increase the expected crash severity.

See also 
 Collision
 Lists of rail accidents
 Road collision types
 Train wreck

References 

Railway accidents and incidents
Road collisions by type
Train collisions